PSRP may refer to:
 (Pyruvate, water dikinase)-phosphate phosphotransferase, an enzyme
 (Pyruvate, water dikinase) kinase, an enzyme
 People's Socialist Revolutionary Party